The Thyella class of destroyers were ordered by the Royal Hellenic Navy before World War I when the Greek government embarked on a naval buildup after losing the Greco-Turkish War of 1897. These four ships were ordered from Britain in 1905 and were among the last vessels built at the Yarrow shipyard at Cubitt Town, London, before its move to the Clyde.

Design

Ships in class

References

External links
 Naval History

Destroyer classes
 
Ships built in Cubitt Town